Wingerworth is a large village and parish in North East Derbyshire, England. Its population, according to the 2011 census, was 6,533.

Tupton, Clay Cross, Grassmoor and Ashover are nearby.

History
Wingerworth is first recorded in the Domesday Book of 1086 as a community of fourteen houses of freemen. In the book it is called Wingreurde, an Anglo-Saxon name meaning "King's Land."

For the bulk of the Middle Ages, the lords of Wingerworth Manor were the Brailsfords. After their stewardship, the lordship descended in a relatively uncertain manner to the Curzons of Kedleston Hall until finally coming under the lordship of the Hunloke Family. The seat of the Hunloke Family was at Wingerworth Hall, which was demolished in 1927 to make way for housing developments, as a buyer could not be found for the property. The Hall was also used as a Roundhead garrison during the English Civil War.

Education
Wingerworth has two mixed-sex, non-denominational primary schools (Deer Park Primary School and Hunloke Park Primary School).  Both have around 200 to 300 pupils, drawn from the area and surrounding villages.  The schools compete in sports such as football, cricket, tag rugby and netball. Wingerworth also has two pre-schools and nurseries in New Road Nursery and Hunloke Park school for children aged between 2–4 years. Secondary education is mostly provided in nearby Tupton, at Tupton Hall secondary school.

Sports
Football is played in Wingerworth and there are several local football teams competing in District leagues. The WJSA is a junior football association that play in the Rowsley league and has many different teams for both boys and girls.
Wingerworth has a Football Pitch, a Cricket Field, several Tennis Courts and a Bowling green in the main park.

Clubs and groups
There are many clubs and groups in the village for all ages, including the 3rd Wingerworth Scout Group 3rd Wingerworth Scout Group for young people aged between 6 and 14, and Wingerworth Wobblers Running Club. The village also had a well-established Cricket Club  who won Division 7N of the Derbyshire County League in 2013. Martial arts clubs are also run within Wingerworth for people of all ages to participate in.

Demography

In the 2011 census, Wingerworth had a population of 6,533 persons. Of that population, 98.3% was White, 0.6% Asian, and 0.8% Mixed/multiple.

See also
Listed buildings in Wingerworth
Wingerworth Hall

References

External links

 OFSTED Reports for Wingerworth schools and nurseries.
 Website of The 3rd Wingerworth Scout Group.
 New Road Nursery, Wingerworth Website
 After School Care in Wingerworth

Villages in Derbyshire
Civil parishes in Derbyshire
North East Derbyshire District